David Alexander Wright (born 3 March 1948) is a New Zealand swimming coach.

Wright was born in Lawrence, Otago, New Zealand. He attended Wairoa College in New Zealand, Thorp High School in Wisconsin, the United States and Victoria University of Wellington.

Wright is an ASCA International Level 5 swimming coach. He has coached national swimming representatives from New Zealand, the United States Virgin Islands, the United States of America and Saudi Arabia. Most notable students include NZ National and/or US State Champions and/or Saudi Arabian Champions Toni Jeffs, Nichola Chellingworth, Jane Copland, Joseph Skuba, Rhi Jeffrey, Jane Ip, John Foster, Loai Tashkandi, Eyad Massoud and Oswaldo Quevedo. Notable events include the award of US Swimming's Certificate of Excellence in 2007, appointment in 2003/2004 as National Coach for the US Virgin Islands, coach of Toni Jeffs at the Barcelona Olympic Games and the 1992 World Short Course Championships where she placed third, coach of Ozzie Quevedo in 2009 when he set two Master's World records in the 50 meters butterfly (24.17) and 100 meters butterfly (54.9)  and in 2016 coached Loai Tashkandi to two silver medals in GCC international meet. Currently coaching Jeddah national swimmers in Saudi Arabia. In association with track coach Arthur Lydiard and New Zealand international swimmer Jane Copland published two books on swimming Swim to the Top, June 2002 and Swimming–A Training Program, April 2004. Contributor to the swimming website www.swimwatch.net.

					
Prior to his career as a swimming coach, Wright coached track athletes including his wife Alison Wright, who represented New Zealand, Oceania and the United Kingdom over 800, 1500 and 3000 meters.

References

External links
 https://web.archive.org/web/20100110105701/http://www.fina.org/masters/wr.php
 https://web.archive.org/web/20091227115122/http://lydiardfoundation.org/about/aboutarthurlydiard.aspx

Living people
1948 births
New Zealand swimming coaches
People educated at Wairoa College
Victoria University of Wellington alumni
New Zealand athletics coaches
People from Lawrence, New Zealand